Spin Away is an album of cover songs done by the pop music group The Lettermen. Originally released on vinyl in 1972 by Capitol Records.  The album was produced by Ed Cobb and Lettermen for Lettermen, Inc.  Vocal Arrangements by Vince Morton and Lettermen.

Track listing 

Production Coordinator: Billy Delbert
Personal Management: Jess Rand

Recorded at Producer's Workshop, Hollywood, California
Engineers: Edd Cobb and Tom Knox

Musicians 
Keyboards: Vince Morton, Michael Lang, Michael Melvoin and Michael Omartian
Guitars: Richard Bennet and David Cohen
Bass: Emory Gordy, Jr.
Drums: Dennis St. John, Jimmy Gordon and Colin Bailey
Percussion: Gary Coleman

References

1972 albums
The Lettermen albums
Capitol Records albums
Covers albums